Nikola Milićević (1776 – 11 May 1842), known by his demonym as Nikola Lunjevica (Луњевица), was a Serbian Revolutionary and close comrade of Prince Miloš Obrenović I of Serbia. He was born in Lunjevica (hence his nickname), a village in the Sanjak of Smederevo, Ottoman Empire (now Serbia). He was relative of Princess Ljubica of Serbia, father of Serbian politician Panta Lunjevica (1840–1887) and grandfather of Draga, the Queen consort of Serbia (1900–1903).

See also
List of Serbian Revolutionaries

References

Sources

19th-century Serbian people
Serbian revolutionaries
People of the First Serbian Uprising
People of the Second Serbian Uprising
People from Gornji Milanovac
People from the Principality of Serbia
1776 births
1842 deaths